Saint Euphrosyne Polotsk State University is a Belarusian public-owned university based in Novopolotsk and Polotsk.

The official seal of the university portraits the buildings of Jesuit College in Polotsk, respectively, which gave rise to the university in 1581.

The university bears the name of St. Euphrosyne of Polotsk, daughter of the Prince of Polotsk, the nun, abbess and educator, the first saint woman in the Belarusian lands.

History
The higher education in Polotsk has old traditions. In 1581 the Jesuit College was founded in Polotsk. On January 12, 1812 the College was reorganized into Polotsk Jesuit Academy according to the Ukaze of the Emperor of Russia Alexander I. The Academy was functioning during 1812-1820 and was the first higher education establishment on Belarusian land.

On July 14, 1968 Novopolotsk branch of Belarusian Polytechnical Institute was created. On February 10, 1969 it was decided to convey Novopolotsk branch of BPI to Belarusian Technological Institute. Since January 1, 1974 it became Novopolotsk Polytechnical Institute named after Leninist Young Communist League of Belarus. On September 14, 1993 Novopolotsk Polytechnical Institute was reorganized into Polotsk State University.

Since 2005 the study process of History and Philology faculty, and since 2008 the faculty of Information Technologies, has been carried out in former Jesuit College in Polotsk.

Since 2016, the Law faculty and faculty of Physical Training Education are situated in Mezhdurechye.

University symbols

PSU has official symbols: flag, emblem and anthem.

The lyrics of Polotsk State University hymn has been written by Hienadz Buraukin.

University now
The study process and research activity is carried out by 500 teachers (including 19 Doctors of Sciences and 167 PhDs).

The university has 75 multimedia classes, and more than 30 computer classes.

Polotsk State University also provides publishing of «Vestnik of Polotsk State University»  which is included in the List of scientific publications of Higher Examination Board.

Moreover, there is a very wide range of clubs and studios which students can participate:

 The honored amateur collective, student theatre «ART»; 
 Pop dance studio «Zhemchuzhina»; 
 Club of intellectual games «RUBON»; 
 Modern dance studio «TORYDANCE»; 
 Solo singing studio «Nastroyeniye»; 
 Student video studio «Konspekt»; 
 KVN; 
student newspaper «Nastezh»; 
 Folk club «Varhan»; 
 Information studio «FACT»; 
 Sports club; 
 Speed cubing club «Kub`ON»

Furthermore, Polotsk State University offers the services of Tourist and Excursion Centre; Driving School; Editing and Publishing etc.

The students of the university actively participate in volunteer work.

University dormitories
There are five dormitories.

Faculties
Humanities
Civil Engineering
Mechanics and Technology
Radio Engineering
Information Technologies
Finance and Economics
Law
For International Students
Pre-University Training

Rectors
 Ernst M. Babenko
 Petr I. Shved
 Dmitry N. Lazovsky

See also
 Education in Belarus
 Jesuit College in Polotsk
 List of Jesuit sites

External links
 Official website
 Official hymn
 Digital library of PSU

References

Universities in Belarus
Educational institutions established in 1968
1968 establishments in Belarus